Scott L. Driggers (born September 11, 1962 in Pensacola, Florida) is an American former handball player who competed in the 1988 Summer Olympics.  He graduated from Colorado College and Harvard Business School.

References

1962 births
Living people
Sportspeople from Pensacola, Florida
American male handball players
Olympic handball players of the United States
Handball players at the 1988 Summer Olympics
Colorado College alumni
Harvard Business School alumni
Medalists at the 1987 Pan American Games
Pan American Games gold medalists for the United States
Pan American Games medalists in handball